"Just Let Me Be in Love" is a song written by Tom Shapiro, Tony Martin and Mark Nesler, and recorded by American country music artist Tracy Byrd.  It was released in August 2001 as the second single from his album Ten Rounds.  It peaked at number 9 on the Hot Country Songs chart.

Content
The song's narrator just wants to be in love with a woman, and doesn't care about what the future might hold for their relationship.

Music video
The music video was directed by the directing duo Deaton-Flanigen.  It was filmed on Anna Maria Island in Florida.

Chart performance
"Just Let Me Be in Love" debuted at number 49 on the U.S. Billboard Hot Country Singles & Tracks for the week of August 25, 2001.

Year-end charts

References

2001 songs
Tracy Byrd songs
2001 singles
Songs written by Mark Nesler
Songs written by Tom Shapiro
Songs written by Tony Martin (songwriter)
Song recordings produced by Billy Joe Walker Jr.
Music videos directed by Deaton-Flanigen Productions
RCA Records Nashville singles